George Henslow (23 March 1835, Cambridge, UK – 30 December 1925, Bournemouth) was an Anglican curate, botanist and author. Henslow was notable for being a defender of Lamarckian evolution.

Biography
The third son of Rev. John Stevens Henslow, George Henslow was educated at King Edward VI School, Bury St Edmunds and then matriculated on 30 May 1854 at Christ's College, Cambridge, where he graduated B.A. 1858 and M.A. 1861. He was ordained in the Church of England a deacon in 1859 and a priest in 1861. In 1864 he became a Fellow of the Linnean Society. He was the headmaster from 1861 to 1864 of Hampton Lucy Grammar School and from 1865 to  1872 of the Grammar School, Store Street, London. From 1868 to 1880 he was Lecturer in Botany at St Bartholomew's Hospital and also at Birkbeck College and Queen's College, London. He was from 1868 to 1870 Curate of
St John's Wood Chapel and from 1870 to 1887 Curate of St James's, Marylebone. He resided at Ealing, where he was from 1882 to 1904 President of the Ealing Microscopical and Natural History Society, then resided at Drayton House in Learnington and finally at Bournemouth. On 26 October 1897 he was among the first 60 medallists of the Victoria Medal of Honour awarded by the Royal Horticultural Society.

He married in Cambridge on 13 October 1859 Ellen Weekley (c. 1836–1875) but they divorced on 8 July 1872.  In St Pancras, London in the 4th registration quarter of 1872 he married Georgina Brook Bailey (1843–1876). In 1881 he married his third wife Katharine Yeo (c. 1845–1919),  the widow of Reverend Yeo of Ealing. George Henslow's third wife brought step-children to his third marriage but bore no more children. There were five children from his first marriage but only one, George Stevens Henslow (1863–1924), survived to adulthood. Henslow died on 30 December 1925 in Bournemouth.

In his later years he became a believer in spiritualism.

Evolution

Henslow was a proponent of theistic evolution who held that "natural selection plays no part in the origin of species." He promoted his Lamarckian theory of evolution in plants by direct adaptation, known as "the True Darwinism". 
He used this term in opposition to Neo-Darwinism, which denied the inheritance of acquired characteristics.

Selected publications

Articles

Books

References

External links
 
 

1835 births
1925 deaths
19th-century English Anglican priests
19th-century English writers
20th-century English Anglican priests
20th-century English writers
Alumni of Christ's College, Cambridge
English botanists
English spiritualists
Lamarckism
Parapsychologists
Parson-naturalists
Theistic evolutionists
Victoria Medal of Honour recipients